Carlos Berlocq was the defending champion but chose not to defend his title.

Damir Džumhur won the title after defeating Calvin Hemery 6–1, 6–3 in the final.

Seeds

Draw

Finals

Top half

Bottom half

References
Main Draw
Qualifying Draw

Internationaux de Tennis de BLOIS - Singles
2017 Singles